Jaisalmer railway station is a major railway station located in Jaisalmer, Rajasthan. The railway station is under the administrative control of North Western Railway of Indian Railways. The station has three platforms and a total of five tracks. Jodhpur- Jaisalmer Railway was merged with the Western Railway in November 1951. Later North Western Railway came into existence on 1 October 2002.

Trains 

Some important trains that originate and terminate at the station:

 Ranikhet Express
 Corbett Park Link Express
 Jaisalmer–Jodhpur Express
 Jaisalmer–Lalgarh Express
 Malani Express
 Jaisalmer–Jodhpur Passenger
 Howrah–Jaisalmer Superfast Express
 Bandra Terminus - Jaisalmer Superfast Express
 Jaisalmer–Sabarmati Express
 Jammu–Jaisalmer Shalimar Express

References

External links
 
 India Rail Info

Railway stations in Jaisalmer district
Buildings and structures in Jaisalmer
Jodhpur railway division
Transport in Jaisalmer